This is the order of battle for Operation Barbarossa, the German invasion of the Soviet Union during World War II. It was fought between the German-led Axis Forces and the Soviet Forces. The operation started on June 22, 1941, and ended on December 5, 1941, at the conclusion of Operation Typhoon.

Axis

German Army Group North
Commanded by Field Marshal Wilhelm von Leeb
(Chief of Staff - Lt. Gen. Kurt Brennecke)

German Sixteenth Army
Colonel General Ernst Busch

 II Corps - General of Infantry Walter von Brockdorff-Ahlefeldt
12th Infantry Division - Lt. Gen. Walther von Seydlitz-Kurzbach
32nd Infantry Division - Lt. Gen. Wilhelm Bohnstedt
121st Infantry Division - Lt. Gen. Otto Lancelle
X Corps - General of Infantry Christian Hansen
30th Infantry Division - Lt. Gen. Kurt von Tippelskirch
126th Infantry Division - Lt. Gen. Paul Laux
XXVIII Corps - General of Infantry Mauritz von Wiktorin
122nd Infantry Division - Lt. Gen. Siegfried Macholz
123rd Infantry Division - Lt. Gen. Walter Lichel

German Eighteenth Army
Colonel General Georg von Küchler
(Chief of Staff - Maj. Gen. Kurt Waeger)
XXVI Corps - General of Artillery Albert Wodrig
61st Infantry Division - Lt. Gen. Siegfried Haenicke
217th Infantry Division - Lt. Gen. Richard Baltzer
291st Infantry Division - Lt. Gen. Kurt Herzog
XXXVIII Corps - General of Infantry Friedrich-Wilhelm von Chappuis
58th Infantry Division - Lt. Gen. Karl von Graffen
254th Infantry Division - Lt. Gen. Walter Behschnitt
I Corps - General of Infantry Kuno-Hans von Both
1st Infantry Division - Lt. Gen. Philipp Kleffel
11th Infantry Division - Lt. Gen. Herbert von Böckmann
21st Infantry Division - Lt. Gen. Otto Sponheimer

Panzergruppe 4
Colonel General Erich Hoepner
(Chief of Staff - Colonel Walter Chales de Beaulieu)
XXXXI Corps (mot.) - General of Panzer Georg Hans Reinhardt
1st Panzer Division - Lt. Gen. Friedrich Kirchner
6th Panzer Division - Lt. Gen. Wilhelm Ritter von Thoma
269th Infantry Division - Lt. Gen. Ernst von Leyser
36th Infantry Division (mot.) - Lt. Gen. Otto-Ernst Ottenbacher
LVI Corps (mot.) - General of Infantry Erich von Manstein
8th Panzer Division - Lt. Gen. Erich Brandenberger
3rd Infantry Division (mot.) - Lt. Gen. Curt Jahn
290th Infantry Division - Lt. Gen. Theodor Freiherr von Wrede
SS-Totenkopf Division - SS-Obergruppenfuhrer Theodor Eicke, on 7. July  Matthias Kleinheisterkamp

Army Group assets and reserves

XXIII Corps (Army Group Reserve) - General of Infantry Albrecht Schubert
251st Infantry Division - Lt. Gen.Hans Kratzert
206th Infantry Division - Lt. Gen. Hugo Höfl
L Corps (OKH reserve Behind AG North) - Lieutenant General Georg Lindemann
86th Infantry Division - Lt. Gen. Joachim Witthöft
SS Police Division - Ss Gr.f. Arthur Mülverstedt
Army Group rear lines
207th Security Division - Lt. Gen. Karl von Tiedemann
281st Security Division - Lt. Gen. Friedrich Bayer
285th Security Division - Lt. Gen. Wolfgang von Plotho

German Army Group Center
Commanded by Field Marshal Fedor von Bock
(Chief of Staff - Maj. Gen. Hans von Greiffenberg)

German Fourth Army
Field Marshal Günther von Kluge
 VII Corps - General of Artillery Wilhelm Fahrmbacher
7th Infantry Division - Lt. Gen. Eccard Freiherr von Gablenz
23rd Infantry Division - Lt. Gen. Heinz Hellmich
258th Infantry Division - Lt. Gen. Waldemar Henrici
268th Infantry Division - Lt. Gen. Erich Straube
IX Corps - General of Infantry Hermann Geyer
137th Infantry Division - Lt. Gen. Friedrich Bergmann
263rd Infantry Division - Lt. Gen. Ernst Haeckel
292nd Infantry Division - Lt. Gen. Martin Dehmel
XIII Corps - General of Infantry Hans Felber
17th Infantry Division - Lt. Gen. Herbert Loch
78th Infantry Division - Lt. Gen. Curt Gallenkamp
XXXXIII Corps - General of Infantry Gotthard Heinrici
131st Infantry Division - Lt. Gen. Heinrich Meyer-Buerdorf
134th Infantry Division - Lt. Gen. Conrad von Cochenhausen
252nd Infantry Division - Lt. Gen. Diether von Boehm-Bezing

German Ninth Army
Colonel General Adolf Strauß
 V Corps - General of Infantry Richard Ruoff
5th Infantry Division - Lt. Gen. Karl Allmendinger
35th Infantry Division - Lt. Gen. Walther Fischer von Weikersthal
VI Corps - General of Pioneer Otto-Wilhelm Förster
6th Infantry Division - Lt. Gen. Helge Auleb
26th Infantry Division - Lt. Gen. Walter Weiß
VIII Corps - General of Artillery Walter Heitz
8th Infantry Division - Lt. Gen. Gustav Höhne
28th Infantry Division - Lt. Gen. Johann Sinnhuber
161st Infantry Division - Lt. Gen. Hermann Wilck
XX Corps - General of Infantry Friedrich Materna
162nd Infantry Division - Lt. Gen. Hermann Franke
256th Infantry Division - Lt. Gen. Gerhard Kauffmann

Panzergruppe 2
Colonel General Heinz Guderian
XII Corps - General of Infantry Walther Schroth (Only under Panzergruppe 2 for initial stages of the invasion)
31st Infantry Division - Lt. Gen. Kurt Kalmukoff
34th Infantry Division - Lt. Gen. Hans Behlendorff
45th Infantry Division - Lt. Gen. Fritz Schlieper
XXIV Corps (mot.) - General of Panzer Leo Geyr von Schweppenburg
3rd Panzer Division - Lt. Gen. Walter Model
4th Panzer Division - Lt. Gen. Willibald Freiherr von Langermann und Erlencamp
10th Infantry Division (mot.) - Lt. Gen. Friedrich-Wilhelm von Loeper
1st Cavalry Division - Lt. Gen. Kurt Feldt
255th Infantry Division - Lt. Gen. Wilhelm Wetzel
267th Infantry Division - Lt. Gen. Robert Martinek
XXXXVI Corps (mot.) - General of Infantry Heinrich von Vietinghoff
10th Panzer Division - Lt. Gen. Ferdinand Schaal
SS-Reich Division - SS-Obergruppenfuhrer Paul Hausser
Infantry Regiment Großdeutschland - Maj. Gen. Wilhelm-Hunert von Stockenhausen
XXXXVII Corps (mot.) - General of Panzer Joachim Lemelsen
17th Panzer Division - Lt. Gen. Hans-Jürgen von Arnim
18th Panzer Division - Lt. Gen. Walther Nehring
29th Infantry Division (mot.) - Lt. Gen. Walter von Boltenstern
167th Infantry Division - Lt. Gen. Hans Schönhärl

Panzergruppe 3
Colonel General Hermann Hoth

XXXIX Corps (mot.) - General of Panzer Rudolf Schmidt
7th Panzer Division - Lt. Gen. Hans Freiherr von Funck
20th Panzer Division - Lt. Gen. Horst Stumpff
14th Infantry Division (mot.) - Lt. Gen. Friedrich Fürst
20th Infantry Division (mot.) - Lt. Gen. Hans Zorn
LVII Corps (mot.) - General of Panzer Adolf-Friedrich Kuntzen
12th Panzer Division - Lt. Gen. Josef Harpe
19th Panzer Division - Lt. Gen. Otto von Knobelsdorff
18th Infantry Division (mot.) - Lt. Gen. Friedrich Herrlein

German Army Group South
Commanded by Field Marshal Gerd von Rundstedt
(Chief of Staff - Lt. Gen. Georg von Sodenstern)

German Sixth Army
Field Marshal Walther von Reichenau
 XVII Corps - General of Infantry Werner Kienitz
56th Infantry Division - Lt. Gen. Karl von Oven
62nd Infantry Division - Lt. Gen. Walter Keiner
XXIX Corps - General of Infantry Hans von Obstfelder
44th Infantry Division - Lt. Gen. Friedrich Siebert
111th Infantry Division - Lt. Gen. Otto Stapf
299th Infantry Division - Lt. Gen. Willi Moser
XXXXIV Corps - General of Infantry Friedrich Koch
9th Infantry Division - Lt. Gen. Siegmund Freiherr von Schleinitz
297th Infantry Division - Lt. Gen. Max Pfeffer
LV Corps - General of Infantry Erwin Vierow
75th Infantry Division - Lt. Gen. Ernst Hammer
57th Infantry Division - Lt. Gen. Oskar Blümm
168th Infantry Division - Lt. Gen. Hans Mundt
298th Infantry Division - Mj. Gen. Walther Graeßner

Panzergruppe 1
Colonel General Paul Ludwig Ewald von Kleist
III Corps (mot.) - General of Cavalry Eberhard von Mackensen
13th Panzer Division - Lt. Gen. Friedrich-Wilhelm von Rothkirch und Panthen
14th Panzer Division - Lt. Gen. Friedrich Kühn
25th Infantry Division (mot.) - Lt. Gen. Erich-Heinrich Clößner
XIV Corps (mot.) - General of Infantry Gustav Anton von Wietersheim
9th Panzer Division - Lt. Gen. Alfred Ritter von Hubicki
SS-Division (mot.) Leibstandarte SS Adolf Hitler - SS-Obergruppenführer Sepp Dietrich
SS-Wiking Division - SS-Brigadeführer Felix Steiner
XXXXVIII Corps (mot.) - General of Panzer Werner Kempf
11th Panzer Division - Lt. Gen. Ludwig Crüwell
16th Panzer Division - Lt. Gen. Hans-Valentin Hube
16th Infantry Division (mot.) - Lt. Gen. Sigfrid Henrici

German Seventeenth Army
General of Infantry Carl-Heinrich von Stülpnagel
 IV Corps - General of Infantry Viktor von Schwedler
24th Infantry Division - Lt. Gen. Hans von Tettau
71st Infantry Division - Lt. Gen. Alexander von Hartmann
262nd Infantry Division - Lt. Gen. 
295th Infantry Division - Lt. Gen. Herbert Geitner
296th Infantry Division - Lt. Gen. Wilhelm Stemmermann
 XXXXIX Mountain Corps - General of Infantry Ludwig Kübler
68th Infantry Division - Lt. Gen. Georg Braun
257th Infantry Division - Lt. Gen. Karl Sachs
1st Mountain Division - Lt. Gen. Hubert Lanz
 LII Corps - General of Infantry Kurt von Briesen
101st Light Infantry Division - Lt. Gen. Erich Marcks
97th Light Infantry Division - Mj. Gen. Maximilian Fretter-Pico
100th Light Infantry Division - Mj. Gen. Werner Sanne
Hungarian Fast Corps - Gen. Béla Miklós
1st Hungarian Motorized Brigade - Bg. Gen. Jenő Major
2nd Hungarian Motorized Brigade - Bg. Gen. János Vörös
1st Hungarian Cavalry Brigade - Bg. Gen 
 Slovak Expeditionary Army Group - Gen. Ferdinand Čatloš
Slovakian Mobile Brigade - LTC. 
1st Slovakian Infantry Division - Lt. Gen. Antonin Pulanich
2nd Slovakian Infantry Division - Lt. Gen.

Romanian Army Group Antonescu
General Ion Antonescu
Romanian Third Army - Lt. Gen. Petre Dumitrescu
Romanian 4th Army Corps - Mj. Gen. Constantin Sănătescu
6th Infantry Division - Br. Gen. 
7th Infantry Division- Br. Gen. 
Cavalry Corps - Mj. Gen. Ioan Mihail Racoviță
5th Cavalry Brigade - Col. 
8th Cavalry Brigade - Col. 
Mountain Corps - Mj. Gen. Gheorghe Avramescu
1st Mountain Brigade - Br. Gen. Mihail Lascăr
2nd Mountain Brigade - Br. Gen. Ioan Dumitrache
4th Mountain Brigade - Br. Gen. Gheorghe Manoliu

German Eleventh Army
Colonel General Eugen Ritter von Schobert
 XI Corps - General of Infantry Joachim von Kortzfleisch
76th Infantry Division - Lt. Gen. Maximilian de Angelis
239th Infantry Division - Lt. Gen. Ferdinand Neuling
1st Romanian Armored Division - Bg. Gen. Ioan Sion
6th Romanian Cavalry Brigade - Mg. Gen. 
XXX Corps - General of Infantry Hans von Salmuth
198th Infantry Division - Lt. Gen. Otto Röttig
8th Romanian Infantry Division - Bg. Gen. 
13th Romanian Infantry Division - Bg. Gen. 
14th Romanian Infantry Division - Bg. Gen. 
LIV Corps - General of Cavalry Erick-Oskar Hansen
50th Infantry Division - Lt. Gen. Karl-Adolf Hollidt
170th Infantry Division - Lt. Gen. 
5th Romanian Infantry Division - Bg. Gen. Petre Vlădescu
Italian Expeditionary Corps - Lt. Gen.Giovanni Messe
9th Infantry Division "Pasubio" - Gen. Vittorio Giovanelli
52nd Infantry Division "Torino" - Gen. Luigi Manzi
3rd Cavalry Division "Principe Amedeo Duca d'Aosta" - Gen. Mario Marazzani
22nd Infantry Division - Lt. Gen. Hans Graf von Sponeck

Romanian Fourth Army - Lt. Gen. Nicolae Ciupercă
Romanian 3rd Army Corps  - Mj. Gen. Vasile Atanasiu
Guards Division - Mj. Gen. 
15th Infantry Division - Mj. Gen. 
35th Reserve Divisions - Br. Gen. 
Romanian 5th Army Corps - Lt. Gen. 
Border Division - Br. Gen. 
21st Division - Mj. Gen. 
Romanian 11th Army Corps - Mj. Gen. I. Aurelian
two fortress brigades
Other assets
Romanian 2nd Army Corps - Mj. Gen. Nicolae Macici
9th Infantry Division - Br. Gen. Hugo Schwab
10th Infantry Division - Br. Gen. Ion Glogojanu
7th Cavalry Brigade - Col. 
11th Infantry Division - Br. Gen. David Popescu

Soviet

Stavka
The "Main Command of the Armed Forces of the USSR" (Stavka Glavnogo Komandovaniya) was formed on 23 June, largely from the existing People's Commissariat for Defence.

Commander in Chief: Marshal Semyon Timoshenko (until July 19), then Josef Stalin
Deputy Commander-in-Chief: Army General Georgy Zhukov (from August 8)
Chief of the General Staff: Army General Georgy Zhukov (until July 21), then Marshal Boris Shaposhnikov

16th Army
Lieutenant General Mikhail Lukin
32nd Rifle Corps - Major General Trofim Kolomiets
46th Rifle Division - Major General Alexander Filatov
152nd Rifle Division - Colonel Pyotr Chernyshov
5th Mechanized Corps - Major General Ilya Alekseyenko
13th Tank Division - Colonel Fyodor Grachev
17th Tank Division - Colonel Ivan Korchagin
109th Motor Rifle Division - Colonel Nikolai Krasnoretsky

19th Army
Lieutenant General Ivan Konev
38th Rifle Division - Colonel Maxim Kirillov
25th Rifle Corps - Major General Sergey Chestohvalov
127th Rifle Division - Major General Timofey Korneyev
134th Rifle Division - Major General Vladimir Kuzmich Bazarov
162nd Rifle Division - Colonel Nikolai Kolkunov
34th Rifle Corps - Major General Raphael Khmelnitsky
129th Rifle Division - Major General Auxentios Gorodnyansky
158th Rifle Division - Colonel V.I. Novozhilov
171st Rifle Division - Major General Alexander Budyho

20th Army
Lieutenant General Fyodor Remezov
18th Rifle Division - Colonel Karp Sviridov
61st Rifle Corps - Major General Fyodor Bakunin
110th Rifle Division - Colonel Vasily Khlebtsov
144th Rifle Division - Major General Mikhail Pronin
172nd Rifle Division - Major General Mikhail Timofeyevich Romanov
69th Rifle Corps - Major General Yevdokim Mogilovchik
73rd Rifle Division - Colonel Alexander Akimov
229th Rifle Division - Major General Mikhail Ivanovich Kozlov 
233rd Rifle Division - Colonel Grigory Kotov
7th Mechanized Corps - Major General Vasily Ivanovich Vinogradov
14th Tank Division - Colonel Ivan Dmitrievich Vasilyev
1st Motor Rifle Division - Colonel Yakov Kreizer

21st Army
Lieutenant General Vasily Gerasimenko
63rd Rifle Corps - Lieutenant General Leonid Petrovsky
53rd Rifle Division - Colonel Ivan Bartenev
148th Rifle Division - Colonel Filipp Cherokmanov
167th Rifle Division - Major General Vasily Rakovsky
66th Rifle Corps - Major General Fyodor Sudakov
61st Rifle Division - Major General Nikolay Prishchepa
117th Rifle Division - Colonel Spiridon Chernyugov
154th Rifle Division - Colonel Yakov Fokanov
25th Mechanized Corps - Major General Semyon Krivoshein
50th Tank Division - Colonel Boris Bakharov
55th Tank Division  - Colonel Vasily Badanov
219th Motor Rifle Division - Major General Pavel Korzun

22nd Army
Lieutenant General Filipp Yershakov
51st Rifle Corps
98th Rifle Division
112th Rifle Division
153rd Rifle Division
62nd Rifle Corps
170th Rifle Division
174th Rifle Division
186th Rifle Division

24th Army
52nd Rifle Corps
91st Rifle Division
119th Rifle Division
166th Rifle Division
53rd Rifle Corps
107th Rifle Division
133rd Rifle Division
178th Rifle Division

Northern Front
General Colonel Markian Popov

The front was the Leningrad Military District until 24 June.

7th Army (Separate)
Lieutenant General Filip Danilovich Gorelenko 
54th Rifle Division - Maj. Gen. I.V. Panin
71st Rifle Division - Col. V.N. Fedorov
168th Rifle Division - Col. A.L. Bondarev
237th Rifle Division - Maj. Gen. D.F. Popov
55th Mixed Aviation Division - Colonel Alexander Bogradetsky

14th Army
Lieutenant General Valerian A. Frolov
14th Rifle Division - Col. A.A. Zhurba
52nd Rifle Division - Mj. Gen. N.N. Nikishin
1st Tank Division - Major General Viktor Ilyich Baranov
42nd Rifle Corps - Major General Roman Ivanovich Panin
104th Rifle Division - Mj. Gen. S.I. Morozov
122nd Rifle Division - Mj. Gen. P.S. Shevchenko
1st Mixed Aviation Division

23rd Army
Lieutenant General P.S. Pshennikov
19th Rifle Corps - Major General M.N. Gerasimov
142nd Rifle Division - Mj. Gen. S.P. Mikul’skii
115th Rifle Division - Mj. Gen. V.F. Kon’kov
50th Rifle Corps - Major General V.I. S'cherbakov
43rd Rifle Division - Mj. Gen. Vladimir Kirpichnikov
70th Rifle Division - Major General Andrey Fedyunin
123rd Rifle Division - Col. Ye.Ye. Tsukanov
10th Mechanized Corps - Major General I. G. Lazarev
21st Tank Division - Col. L.V. Bunin
24th Tank Division - Col. M.I. Chesnokov
198th Motor Rifle Division - Mj. Gen. Vladimir Kryukov
5th Mixed Aviation Division
41st Bomber Aviation Division

Front Assets
177th Rifle Division - Col. A.F. Mashoshin
191st Rifle Division - Col. D.K. Luk’yanov
1st Mechanized Corps - Major General M. L. Cherniavsky
3rd Tank Division - Col. K.Yu. Andreev
163rd Motor Rifle Division - Mj. Gen. N.M. Kuznetsov
Frontal aviation
2nd Mixed Aviation Division
39th Fighter Aviation Division
3rd PVO Fighter Aviation Division
54th PVO Fighter Aviation Division

Northwestern Front
General Colonel Fyodor Isodorovich Kuznetsov
Source:

Baltic Special Military District until 22 June.

8th Army
Lieutenant General Pyotr Sobennikov
10th Rifle Corps - Major General I.F. Nikolaev
10th Rifle Division - Col. I.I. Fadeev
48th Rifle Division  - Mj. Gen. P.V. Bogdanov
90th Rifle Division - Col. Mikhail Golubev
11th Rifle Corps - Major General M.S. Shumilov
11th Rifle Division - Col. N.A. Sokolov
125th Rifle Division - Mj. Gen. P.P. Bogaichuk
12th Mechanized Corps - Major General N.M. Shestopalov
23rd Tank Division - Col. T.S. Orlenko
202nd Motor Rifle Division - Col. V.K. Gorbachev

11th Army
Lieutenant General V. I. Morosov
23rd Rifle Division - Mj. Gen. V.F. Pavlov
126th Rifle Division - Mj. Gen. M.A. Kuznetsov
128th Rifle Division - Mj. Gen. A.S. Zotov
16th Rifle Corps - Major General F.S. Ivanov
5th Rifle Division - Col. Fyodor Ozerov
33rd Rifle Division - Mj. Gen. Karp Zheleznikov
188th Rifle Division - Col. P.I. Ivanov
29th Rifle Corps - Major General A.G. Samokhin
179th Rifle Division - Col. A.I. Ustinov
184th Rifle Division - Col. M.V. Vinogradov
3rd Mechanized Corps - Major General Alexey Kurkin
2nd Tank Division - Mj. Gen. Yegor Solyankin
5th Tank Division - Col. F.F. Fedorov
84th Motorized Division - Mj. Gen. P.I. Fomenko

27th Army
Lieutenant General Nikolai Berzarin
16th Rifle Division - Maj. Gen. I.M. Lyubovtsev
67th Rifle Division - Maj. Gen. N.A. Dedaev
3rd Rifle Brigade
22nd Rifle Corps - Major General Mikhail Dukhanov
180th Rifle Division - Col. I.I. Missan
182nd Rifle Division - Col. I.I. Kuryshev
24th Rifle Corps - Major General K. Kachalov
181st Rifle Division - Col. P.V. Borisov
183rd Rifle Division - Col. P.N. Tupikov

Front Assets
5th Airborne Corps - Major General Ivan Bezugly
9th Airborne Brigade
10th Airborne Brigade
201st Airborne Brigade
Frontal aviation
57th Fighter Aviation Division
4th Mixed Aviation Division
6th Mixed Aviation Division
7th Mixed Aviation Division
8th Mixed Aviation Division
21st PVO Fighter Aviation Division

Western Front
General Colonel Dmitry Grigorevich Pavlov

Western Special Military District until 22 June.

3rd Army
Lieutenant General Vasily Kuznetsov
4th Rifle Corps- Major General Yevgeny Yegorov
27th Rifle Division - Mj. Gen. Aleksandr Stepanov
56th Rifle Division - Mj. Gen. Semyon Sakhnov
85th Rifle Division - Mj. Gen. Aleksandr Bondovsky
11th Mechanized Corps - Major General Dmitry Mostevenko
29th Tank Division - Col. N.P. Studnev
33rd Tank Division - Col. Mikhail Panov
204th Motor Rifle Division - Col. A.M. Pirogov

4th Army
Lieutenant General  Aleksandr Korobkov 
49th Rifle Division - Col. C.F. Vasil’ev
75th Rifle Division - Col. Nedwigin
28th Rifle Corps - Major General Vasily Popov
6th Rifle Division - Col. M.A. Popsiu-Shapko
42nd Rifle Division - Major General Ivan Lazarenko
14th Mechanized Corps - Major General Stepan Oborin
22nd Tank Division - Mj. Gen. V.P. Puganov
30th Tank Division - Col. Semen Bogdanov
205th Motor Rifle Division - Col. F.F. Kudjurov

10th Army
Lieutenant General Konstantin Golubev
1st Rifle Corps - Major General F.D. Rubtzov
2nd Rifle Division - Col. M.D. Grishin
8th Rifle Division - Col. N.I. Fomin
5th Rifle Corps - Major General A.V. Garnov
13th Rifle Division - Col. A.Z. Naumov
86th Rifle Division - Col. M.A. Zashibalov
113th Rifle Division - Mj. Gen. Kh.N. Alaverdov
6th Cavalry Corps - Major General I.S. Nikitin
6th Cavalry Division - Mj. Gen. Mikhail Konstantinov
36th Cavalry Division - Mj. Gen. E.S. Zybin
6th Mechanized Corps - Major General Mikhail Khatskilevich
4th Tank Division - Mj. Gen. A.G. Potaturchev
7th Tank Division - Mj. Gen. S.V. Borzilov
29th Motor Rifle Division - Mj. Gen. I.P. Bikdjanov
13th Mechanized Corps - Major General Pyotr Akhlyustin
25th Tank Division - Col. N.M. Nikiforov
31st Tank Division - Col. S.A. Kalikhovich
208th Motor Rifle Division - Col. Vladimir Nichiporovich

Front Assets
2nd Rifle Corps - Major General Arkady Yermakov
100th Rifle Division - Major General Ivan Russiyanov
161st Rifle Division - Colonel Alexey Mikhaylov
21st Rifle Corps - Major General Vladimir Borisov
17th Rifle Division - Major General Terenty Batsanov
24th Rifle Division - Major General Kuzma Galitsky
37th Rifle Division - Colonel Andrey Chekharin
44th Rifle Corps - Major General Vasily Yushkevich
64th Rifle Division - Colonel Sergey Iovlev
108th Rifle Division - Major General Alexander Mavrichev
47th Rifle Corps - Major General Stepan Povetkin
50th Rifle Division - Major General Vasily Yevdokimov
55th Rifle Division - Colonel Dmitry Ivanyuk
121st Rifle Division - Major General Pyotr Zykov
143rd Rifle Division - Major General Dmitry Safonov
4th Airborne Corps - Major General Alexey Zhadov
7th Airborne Brigade - Colonel Mikhail Tikhonov
8th Airborne Brigade - Lieutenant Colonel Alexander Onufriyev
214th Airborne Brigade - Colonel Alexey Levashov
17th Mechanized Corps - Major General Mikhail Petrov
27th Tank Division - Colonel Alexey Akhmanov
36th Tank Division - Colonel Sergey Miroshnikov
209th Motorized Division - Colonel Alexey Muravyov
20th Mechanized Corps - Major General Andrey Nikitin
26th Tank Division - Major General Viktor Obukhov
38th Tank Division - Colonel Sergey Kapustin
210th Motorized Division - Major General Feofan Parkhomenko
Frontal aviation
43rd Fighter Aviation Division
12th Bomber Aviation Division
13th Bomber Aviation Division
9th Mixed Aviation Division
10th Mixed Aviation Division
11th Mixed Aviation Division
184th PVO Fighter Aviation Division
Additionally 59th and 60th Fighter Aviation Divisions were forming.

Southwestern Front
General Colonel Mikhail Kirponos

Kiev Special Military District until 22 June.

5th Army
Lieutenant General M.I. Potapov
15th Rifle Corps - Major General Ivan Fedyuninsky
45th Rifle Division - Mj. Gen. G.I. Sherstyuk
62nd Rifle Division - Col. M.P. Timoshenko
27th Rifle Corps - Major General P.D. Artememko
87th Rifle Division - Mj. Gen. Filipp Alyabushev
124th Rifle Division - Mj. Gen. F.G. Sushii
135th Rifle Division - Mj. Gen. F.N. Smekhotvorov
22nd Mechanized Corps - Major General S.M. Kondrusev
19th Tank Division - Mj. Gen. K.A. Semenchenko
41st Tank Division - Col. P.P. Pavlov
215th Motor Rifle Division - Col. P.A. Barabanov

Transferred to 5th Army from Front command on evening of June 22nd
9th Mechanized Corps - Major General Konstantin Rokossovsky
20th Tank Division - Col. Mikhail Katukov
35th Tank Division - Mj. Gen. N.A. Novikov
131st Motorized Division - Col. N.V. Kalinin
19th Mechanized Corps - Major General Nikolay Feklenko
40th Tank Division - Col. M.V. Shirobokov
43rd Tank Division - Col. I.G. Tsibin

6th Army
Lieutenant General Ivan Muzychenko
6th Rifle Corps - Major General I.I. Alekseev
41st Rifle Division - Mj. Gen. G.N. Mikushev
97th Rifle Division - Col. N.M. Zakharov
159th Rifle Division - Col. Ivan Mashchenko
37th Rifle Corps - Major General S.P. Zibin
80th Rifle Division - Mj. Gen. V.I. Prokhorov
139th Rifle Division - Col. N.L. Loginov
141st Rifle Division - Mj. Gen. Ya.I. Tonkonogov
5th Cavalry Corps - Major General F.V. Kamkov
3rd Cavalry Division - Major General Mikhail Maleyev
14th Cavalry Division - Vasily Kryuchenkin
4th Mechanized Corps - Major General Andrey Vlasov
8th Tank Division - Col. P.S. Fotchenkov
32nd Tank Division - Col. E.G. Pushkin
81st Motor Rifle Division - Col. P.M. Varipaev

Transferred to 6th Army from 26th Army on evening of June 22nd
8th Mechanized Corps - Major General Dmitry Ryabyshev
12th Tank Division - Mj. Gen. T.A. Mishanin
34th Tank Division - Col. I.V. Vasil'ev
7th Motor Rifle Division - Col. A.G. Gerasimov
Transferred to 6th Army from Front command on evening of June 22nd
15th Mechanized Corps - Major General I.I. Karpezo
10th Tank Division - Mj. Gen S.Ya. Ogurtsov
37th Tank Division - Col. F.G. Anikushkin
212th Motor Rifle Division - Mj. Gen. S.V. Baranov

12th Army
Lieutenant General Pavel Ponedelin
13th Rifle Corps - Major General Nikolai Kirillov
44th Mountain Division - Mj. Gen. S.A. Tkachenko
58th Mountain Division - Mj. Gen. N.I. Proshkin
192nd Mountain Division - Col. S.D. Gubin
17th Rifle Corps - Major General Ivan Galanin
60th Mountain Rifle Division - Mj. Gen. M.B. Salikhov
96th Mountain Rifle Division - Mj. Gen. Ivan Shepetov
164th Rifle Division - Col. A.N. Chervinskii
16th Mechanized Corps - Major General A.D. Sokolov
15th Tank Division - Col. V.I. Polozkov
39th Tank Division - Col. N.V. Starkov
240th Motor Rifle Division - Col. I.V. Gorbenko

26th Army
Lieutenant General F. Ya. Kostenko
8th Rifle Corps - Major General M.G. Snegov
72nd Mountain Division - Mj. Gen. P.I. Abramidze
99th Rifle Division - Col. N.I.Dement'ev
173rd Rifle Division - Mj. Gen. S.V.Verzin

Front Assets
31st Rifle Corps - Major General Anton Lopatin
193rd Rifle Division - Col. A.K. Berestov
195th Rifle Division - Mj. Gen. V.N. Nesmelov
200th Rifle Division - Col. Ivan Lyudnikov
36th Rifle Corps - Major General P.V. Sisoev
140th Rifle Division - Col. Luka Basanets
146th Rifle Division - Mj. Gen. I.M. Gerasimov
228th Rifle Division - Col. A.M. Il’in
49th Rifle Corps - Major General Ivan Alekseyevich Kornilov
190th Rifle Division - Col. G.A. Zverev
197th Rifle Division - Col. S.D. Gubin
199th Rifle Division - Col. A.N. Alekseev
55th Rifle Corps - Major General Konstantin Koroteev
130th Rifle Division - Mj. Gen. V.A. Vizzhili
169th Rifle Division - Mj. Gen. I.E. Turunov
189th Rifle Division - Combrig A.S. Chichkanov
1st Airborne Corps - Major General Matvei Usenko
1st Airborne Brigade
204th Airborne Brigade
211th Airborne Brigade
213rd Motor Rifle Division - Col. V.M.Osminskiy
24th Mechanized Corps - Major General Vladimir Chistyakov
45th Tank Division - Col. Mikhail Solomatin
49th Tank Division - Col. K.F. Shvetsov
216th Motor Rifle Division - Col. A. Sarkisyan
Frontal aviation
44th Fighter Aviation Division
64th Fighter Aviation Division
19th Bomber Aviation Division
62nd Bomber Aviation Division
14th Mixed Aviation Division
15th Mixed Aviation Division
16th Mixed Aviation Division
17th Mixed Aviation Division
63rd Mixed Aviation Division
36th PVO Fighter Aviation Division

Southern Front
General Colonel Ivan Tyulenev

9th Army (Separate)
Lieutenant General Yakov Cherevichenko
14th Rifle Corps - Major General E.G. Egorov
25th Rifle Division - Col. A.S. Zakharchenko
51st Rifle Division - Mj. Gen. P.G. Tsirul’nikov
35th Rifle Corps - Major General I.F. Dashichev
95th Rifle Division - Mj. Gen. A.I. Pastrevich
176th Rifle Division - Mj. Gen. V.M.Martsinkevich
48th Rifle Corps - Major General Rodion Malinovsky
30th Mountain Division - Mj. Gen. S.G. Galaktionov
74th Rifle Division - Col. F.Ye. Sheverdin
150th Rifle Division - Mj. Gen. I.I. Khorun
2nd Cavalry Corps - Major General Pavel Alexeyevich Belov
5th Cavalry Division - Colonel Viktor Kirillovich Baranov
9th Cavalry Division - Col. A.F. Bychkovsky
2nd Mechanized Corps - Major General Y.V. Novoselsky
11th Tank Division - Col. G.I. Kuzmin
16th Tank Division - Col. M.I. Mindro
15th Motorized Division - Col. Nikolay Belov
18th Mechanized Corps - Major General P.V. Volokh
44th Tank Division - Col. V.P. Krimov
47th Tank Division - Col. Georgy Rodin
218th Motor Rifle Division - Mj. Gen. F.N. Shilov
20th Mixed Aviation Division
21st Mixed Aviation Division
45th Mixed Aviation Division
65th Fighter Aviation Division (forming)
66th Fighter Aviation Division (forming)

Front Assets
7th Rifle Corps - Major General K.L. Dobroserdov
116th Rifle Division - Col. Ya.F. Eremenko
196th Rifle Division - Maj. Gen. K.E. Kulikov
206th Rifle Division - Col. Sergey Gorshkov
9th Rifle Corps - Major General Pavel Batov
106th Rifle Division - Combrig M.S. Tkachev
156th Rifle Division - Mj. Gen. P.V. Chernyaev
32nd Cavalry Division - Col. A.I. Batskalevich
3rd Airborne Corps - Major General Vasili Glazunov
5th Airborne Brigade - Colonel Alexander Rodimtsev
6th Airborne Brigade - Colonel Viktor Zholudev
212th Airborne Brigade - Colonel Ivan Zatevakhin
47th Rifle Division

Air Forces

Axis

Luftwaffe 
The directive issued to the Luftwaffe for Barbarossa ordered that Luftflotte 2, under the command of Albert Kesselring was to be the strongest Air Fleet. Kesselring was assigned to supporting Army Group Centre, which was to capture Minsk, Smolensk and Moscow. Kesselring was given Fliegerkorps VIII (a specialised ground attack Corps, commanded by tactical specialist Wolfram Freiherr von Richthofen), Fliegerkorps II (commanded by Bruno Loerzer) and the 1st Anti-Aircraft Corps (1st AA Corps under Walther von Axthelm). Army Group South was supported by Luftflotte 4, containing Fliegerkorps V (under Robert Ritter von Greim) and Fliegerkorps IV (under Kurt Pflugbeil). The Air Fleet and Army Group were responsible for capturing Kiev, the Crimea and the Caucasus oilfields. Army Group North was supported by Luftflotte 1, and Luftflotte 5. Luftflotte 5 conducted operations in the Arctic near Murmansk. Luftflotte 1 supported operations in the Baltic Sea, Baltic States and near, in and over Leningrad. Luftflotte 1 contained Fliegerkorps I under the command of Helmuth Förster.

Other Axis air forces 
The Romanian Air Force was considered weak by the OKL, and therefore unlikely to play a great role in the ground fighting. Far more attention was given by the OKW to training and preparing the Romanian Army. Hitler, on 18 June 1941, declared that the primary mission of the Romanian air arm was to defend Romania and the Romanian oilfields. Only when those forces were sufficient, could they divert the remaining forces to ground support operations for Barbarossa. On 21 June 1941, it possessed a balanced fleet of 53 Squadrons; 11 bomber (five modern), 17 fighter (nine modern), 15 reconnaissance, six liaison, two flying boat, one transport and one air ambulance unit. On the 22 June, there was 160 fighters and 82 bombers in service. Total strength amounted to 380 aircraft. Only 30 of the Romanian fighters were Bf 109s, of the E model. However, this small force did not remain inferior in numbers for along. Despite a weak inter-war economy, the aircraft industry was run very efficiently, and they were able to produce some very capable aircraft; such as the IAR 37 and IAR 39. Unlike the army that stagnated, it was able to garner the cream of the Romanian officer corps. With the right support, organisation and modern equipment, it was able to grow in number and match its enemies in quality. In air defence and ground support operations it performed well, but failed in strategic bomber and naval operations owing to a lack of doctrine. Within a few weeks of Barbarossa beginning, it was able to put up 1,061 aircraft, including 400 trainers. The modern combat aircraft were focused into one unified Air Combat Command, or GAL (Gruparea Aeriana Lupta), while the obsolete types were given the Romanian Fourth Army, operating under the German Army Group South.

Soviet

Organisation
Since 1935, Soviet military aviation had been divided between the army (VVS KA) and the navy (VVS VMF). The VVS KA had been split into four different organisations owing to faulty conclusions drawn from the Winter War. Owing to a lack of coordination in close support operations with the Red Army, the entire VVS KA was subordinated to the field armies. The existence of too many different branches under separate commands in Soviet air power caused coordination problems (made worse by Axis bombing during Barbarossa). Most Soviet bomber units could not coordinate with fighter aviation, consequently they did not have fighter escort for long periods.

The total strength of the VVS amounted to 61 divisions; 18 fighter, nine bomber and 34 mixed. Five brigades were also included.
The Front Air Forces were divided into Districts (later 'Fronts') and the home defence, the PVO. This element had 40.5 per cent of the Soviet air strength. The Army Air Forces comprised 43.7 per cent of the VVS' strength. The liaison squadrons were a collection of individual squadrons assigned to different army corps of the ground army (KAE). They comprised only 2.3 per cent.

The Soviet order of battle:

Leningrad and Baltic Fronts

VVS Leningrad Military District, later the VVS Northern Front
1st Composite Air Division (1st SAD), subordinate to the 14th Army
 10 BAP (Bomber Aviation Regiment)
 137 BAP
 145th Fighter Aviation Regiment (145 IAP)
 147 IAP
55th Composite Aviation Division (55 SAD) (subordinated to the 7th Army)
 72 SBAP (High Speed Bomber Aviation Regiment)
 153rd Fighter Aviation Regiment
 5 SAD (subordinated to the 23rd Army)
 7 IAP
 159 IAP
 158 IAP
 41 SAD (subordinate to the 23rd Army)
 201 SBAP
 202 SBAP
 205 SBAP
 3rd Fighter Aviation Division (IAD)
 191 Fighter Aviation Regiment (IAP)
 44 IAP
 54 IAD
 26 IAP
 157 IAP
 311 RAP
 2 SAD
 2 SBAP
 SBAP 44
 58 SBAP
 65 ShAD (Ground Attack Aviation Division)
 39 IAD
 154 IAP
 155 IAP
 156 IAP
The total strength of the front was 1,270 aircraft.

 VVS Baltic Special Military District, later the VVS North-Western Front
 8 SAD
 15 IAP
 31 IAP
 61 ShAP.
 57 IAD
 42 IAP
 49 IAP
 54 SBAP
 7 SAD
10 IAP
 9 SBAP
 46 BAP
 241 SBAP
 6 SAD
 21 IAP
 31 SBAP
 40 BAP
 148 IAP
 4 SAD
 38 IAP
 35 SBAP
 50 SBAP
 53 SBAP
The total strength of the front was 1,211 aircraft.

Western and South Western Fronts

VVS Western Military District, later the VVS Western Front
 313 RAP
314 RAP
 9 Mixed Air Division (SAD) (attached to 10th Army near Bialystock)
 13 SBAP
 41 Fighter Aviation Regiment (IAP)
 124 IAP
126 IAP
129 IAP
 10 SAD (attached to 4th Army near Brest-Litovsk)
 33 IAP
 74 ShAP
 123 IAP
 39 SBAP
 11 SAD (attached to 3rd Army near Grodno-Lida)
16 SBAP
 122 IAP
 127 IAP
 12 BAD (Vitebsk)
 6 SBAP
 43 SBAP
 128 SBAP
 209 SBAP
 215 SBAP
 43 IAD (Minsk and Smolensk)
 160 IAP
 161 IAP
 162 IAP
 163 IAP
 13 BAD (Bobruysk)
 24 SBAP
 97 SBAP
 121 SBAP
 125 SBAP
 130 SBAP
The total strength of the front was 1,789 aircraft.

 VVS Kiev Special Military District, later the VVS South-Western Front
 315 RAP and 316 RAP
 14 SAD (5th Army, Lutsk area)
 17 IAP
 46 IAP
 89 IAP
 62 BAD (Kiev)
 52 SBAP
 94 SBAP
 243 SBAP
 245 SBAP
 15 SAD (attached to the 6th Army), Lvov)
 23 IAP
 28 IAP
 66 ShAP
 164 IAP
 16 SAD (attached to 6th Army), Ternopol)
 86 SBAP
 87 IAP
 92 IAP
 226 SBAP
 227 SBAP
 63 SAD (attached to 26th Army), Stryy)
 20 IAP
 62 IAP
 91 IAP
 165 IAP
64 SAD (12th Army), Stanislav
12 IAP
 149 IAP
 166 IAP
 246 IAP
 247 IAP
17 BAD (Proskurov)
48 SBAP
224 SBAP
225 SBAP
242SBAP
244 SBAP
36 IAD (Kiev)
 2 IAP
 43 IAP
 254 IAP
 255 IAP
 19 BAD (Bila Tserkva)
 33 SBAP
136 BAP
 38 SBAP
 44 IAD (Vinnitsa)
 88 IAP
 248 IAP
 249 IAP
 252 IAP
The total strength of the front was 1,913 aircraft.

Odessa Front and Long Range Aviation

VVS Odessa Military District, later the VVS Southern Front
 146 RAP
 317 RAP
 20 SAD (Beltsy and Tiropol)
 4 IAP
 45 SBAP
 55 IAP
 211 SBAP
 21 SAD (Bolgrad-Vorms)
 5 BAP
 69 IAP
 67 IAP
 168 IAP
 299 ShAP
The total strength of the front was 950 aircraft.

 DBA (Long-range Strategic Bomber Aviation)
 1 BAK (Bomber Aviation Group) (Novgorod)
 40 DBAD
 53 DBAD
 200 DBAD
 7 TDBAP
 2 BAK (Kursk)
 35 DBAD
 100 DBAD
 219 DBAD
 223 DBAD
 48 DBAD
 51 DBAD
 220 DBAD
 221 DBAD
 222 DBAD
 3 BAK (Smolensk)
 52 DBAD
 3 TBDAP
 98 DBAD
 212 DBAD
 42 DBAD
 1 TBDAP
 96 DBAD
 207 DBAD
 4 BAK (Zaporozhye)
 22 DBAD
 8 DBAD
 11 DBAD
 21 DBAD
 50 DBAD
 81 DBA
 299 DBAP
 231 DBAP
 228 DBAP
 18 DBAD (Independent Division) (Skomorokhy and Boryspil)
 14 TDBAP
 90 DBAP
 93 DBAP

The total strength of the front was 1,332 aircraft; 1,122 DB-3s, 20 TB-3s, and nine TB-7s.

Notes

Bibliography
 Bergström, Christer. Barbarossa - The Air Battle: July–December 1941, London: Chevron/Ian Allan, 2007. .
 Plocher, Hermann. The German Air Force versus Russia, 1941. United States Air Force Studies, Washington, 1968. 
 Plocher, Hermann. The German Air Force versus Russia, 1942. United States Air Force Studies, Washington, 1968. 
 Statiev, Alexander. Antonescu's Eagles against Stalin's Falcons: The Romanian Air Force, 1920-1941, in 'The Journal of Military History', Volume 66, No. 4 (Oct. 2002), pp. 1085–1113

External links
 Soviet Rifle Division, 22 June 1941
 Soviet Tank Division, 22 June 1941
 Soviet Cavalry Division, 22 June 1941
 Soviet Mountain Rifle Division, 22 June 1941
 Soviet Mechanized Division, 22 June 1941

Operation Barbarossa
Eastern Front (World War II)
World War II orders of battle